Marcus Vinicius (also spelled Vinucius) was a Roman senator and general, who held a number of posts in the service of the first Roman emperor, Augustus. Vinicius was suffect consul in the latter part of 19 BC with Quintus Lucretius Vespillo as his colleague.

Career
Born the son of a Roman knight at Cales in Regio I (Latium et Campania) of Italia, Vinicius distinguished himself as legatus Augusti pro praetore or governor of the imperial province of Gallia Belgica in 25 BC, when he led a successful campaign into Germania.

At some point, Vinicius may also have served as governor of the senatorial province of Achaea; an inscription from Corinth, dated to 18–12 BC and honoring his fellow-general, and the Emperor's right-hand man, Marcus Vipsanius Agrippa, reveals that an administrative division of the city had been named the tribus Vinicia, apparently in Vinicius' honor. In recognition of his services, Vinicius, the archetypal homo novus, was appointed suffect consul in 19 BC, replacing Gaius Sentius Saturninus.

After his consulship, Vinicius continued to be entrusted with important military commands. He served as governor of Illyricum at the beginning of a series of rebellions which were called by Roman sources bellum Pannonicum (Pannonian war, 14–10 BC) until late 13 BC when Augustus assigned the supreme command to Marcus Vipsanius Agrippa. An inscription found at Tusculum reads "... propraetor of Caesar Augustus in [Illyricum; he was the first to advance] beyond the river Danube; he [routed] the army of [the Dacians] and the Bastarnae in battle; he brought the Cotini, [Osi], . . . and Anartii [under the sway of Imperator Caesar] Augustus [and the Roman people].

Between AD 1 and 4, Vinicius commanded the five legions stationed in Germany. His army fought so successfully that he was awarded ornamenta triumphalia.

Throughout his life, Vinicius seems to have enjoyed a close friendship with the emperor: the historian Suetonius quotes a letter by Augustus in which he talks about playing dice with Vinicius and his fellow homo novus, Publius Silius Nerva.

Family
Vinicius' son Publius was consul in AD 2. His grandson and namesake Marcus Vinicius was consul in 30 and the husband of Julia Livilla, granddaughter of the emperor Tiberius.

Legacy
The Roman tribe Vinicia was probably named in his honor.

Notes

References
Ronald Syme (1939). The Roman Revolution. Oxford: Clarendon Press.
Ursula Vogel-Weidemann (1982). Die Statthalter von Africa und Asia in den Jahren 14-68 n. Chr.: Eine Untersuchung zum Verhältnis Princeps und Senat. Bonn: Habelt.

1st-century BC Romans
1st-century Romans
Ancient Roman generals
Senators of the Roman Empire
Suffect consuls of Imperial Rome
Vinicius, Marcus (19 BC)
Year of birth unknown
Year of death unknown